Los Tres Caínes (The 3 Cains) is a 2013 Spanish-language telenovela produced by RTI Producciones for Colombia-based television network RCN TV and United States-based television network MundoFox. Based on the story of the Colombian paramilitary leaders Carlos Castaño, Vicente Castaño and Fidel Castaño. Gregorio Pernía stars as the protagonist.

Cast

Castaño family

Self-defenses

Medellín cartel, family and hitmen

Government and press

Police and army

ECAR and M-19

Cali Cartel and allies

Norte del Valle Cartel y other characters

Misstresses

Broadcasters

References

External links
Official website RCN TV:
Official website Mundo FOX:

2013 telenovelas
Colombian telenovelas
RTI Producciones telenovelas
2013 Colombian television series debuts
2013 Colombian television series endings
RCN Televisión telenovelas
Spanish-language telenovelas
Television shows set in Bogotá